In mathematics, a Bunce–Deddens algebra, named after John W. Bunce and James A. Deddens, is a certain type of AT algebra, a direct limit of matrix algebras over the continuous functions on the circle, in which the connecting maps are given by embeddings between families of shift operators with periodic weights.

Each inductive system defining a Bunce–Deddens algebra is associated with a supernatural number, which is a complete invariant for these algebras. In the language of K-theory, the supernatural number correspond to the  group of the algebra. Also, Bunce–Deddens algebras can be expressed as the -crossed product of the Cantor set with a certain natural minimal action known as an odometer action. They also admit a unique tracial state. Together with the fact that they are AT, this implies they have real rank zero.

The classification of Bunce–Deddens algebras is thus a precursor to the general result.

It is also known that, in general, crossed products arising from minimal homeomorphism on the Cantor set are simple AT-algebras of real rank zero.

Definition and basic properties

Definition 

For a supernatural number , the corresponding Bunce–Deddens algebra  is the direct limit:

 
One needs to define the embeddings

These imbedding maps arise from the natural embeddings between -algebras generated by shifts with periodic weights. Because the map from  into  preserves the compact operators, it descends into an embedding . It is this embedding that is used in the definition of Bunce–Deddens algebras.

The connecting maps 

The 's can be computed more explicitly and we now sketch this computation. This will be useful in obtaining an alternative characterization description of the Bunce–Deddens algebras, and also the classification of these algebras.

The -algebra  is in fact singly generated.

 
where  is the unilateral shift. Since it is clear that  contains , this shows .

From the Toeplitz short exact sequence,

one has,

where  is the entrywise embedding map and  the entrywise quotient map on the Toeplitz algebra. So the -algebra  is singly generated by

 into . This is the connecting map  from the definition of the Bunce–Deddens algebra that we need to analyze.

The image of the above operator  under the natural embedding is the following  operator matrix in :

A computation with matrix units yields that

and

where

So

In this particular instance,  is called a twice-around embedding. The reason for the terminology is as follows: as  varies on the circle, the eigenvalues of  traces out the two disjoint arcs connecting 1 and -1. In general, when  , one has a similar -times around embedding.

K-theory and classification 

Bunce–Deddens algebras are classified by their  groups.

As it follows from the definition that two Bunce–Deddens algebras with the same supernatural number, in the sense that the two supernatural numbers formally divide each other, are isomorphic,  is a complete invariant of these algebras.

As a crossed product

-crossed product 

for all , .

is defined to be the -algebra with the following universal property: for any covariant representation , the -algebra generated by its image is a quotient of

Odometer action on Cantor set 

The Bunce–Deddens algebras in fact are crossed products of the Cantor sets with a natural action by the integers .  Consider, for example, the Bunce–Deddens algebra of type . Write the Cantor set  as sequences of 0's and 1's,

with the product topology. Define a homeomorphism

by

where  denotes addition with carryover. This is called the odometer action. The Bunce–Deddens algebra of type  is isomorphic to the resulting crossed product.

References 

C*-algebras